The 1987 European Competition for Women's Football final was an association football match on 14 June 1987 at the Ullevaal Stadion in Oslo to determine the winner of 1987 European Competition for Women's Football.

Final

References

External links
Official tournament website

1987
1987
1987
June 1987 sports events in Europe